Ballett Zürich, formerly known as Zürich Ballet, is the largest professional ballet company in Switzerland. Its principal venue is the Zürich Opera House and it regularly tours across the country. The company includes an ensemble cast of 36 dancers and 14 junior members. Christian Spuck has directed the company since 2012, assuming the role from Heinz Spoerli.

The ensemble danced in the 2012–13 season before a total of 48,061 visitors, averaging a space occupancy of 93.5%.

History 
Ballet Zürich emerged from Zürich's now defunct "Ballet of City Theatre".

From 1978–1985 Balanchine-specialist Patricia Neary held the post of ballet director. Starting in 1985, Uwe Scholz, with 26 years the youngest director of a dance company in Europe, took over the management of the Zurich Ballet until 1991. Subsequently, Bernd Roger Bienert led the Zurich Ballet until 1996. Heinz Spoerli, ballet director from 1996–2012, established the company among the leading European ballet formations. A neoclassical dance style was cultivated with ballets like The Goldberg Variations, A Midsummer Night's Dream or Peer Gynt and great classical ballets such as Giselle or The Nutcracker. The company also presented works of other choreographers such as George Balanchine, Mats Ek, William Forsythe, Jiri Kylian, Hans von Manen or Twyla Tharp.

Since the 2012–13 season Christian Spuck, former choreographer of the Stuttgart Ballet, leads the Ballet Zürich. Under his leadership, the company maintains the established traditions of the ensemble and sets new artistic accents. Internationally renowned choreographers such as William Forsythe, Paul Lightfoot, Sol León, Douglas Lee, Martin Schläpfer, Jiří Kylián, Wayne McGregor, Marco Goecke, and Mats Ek have already worked with the Ballet Zürich.

The Junior Ballet was founded in 2001 to promote young dancers. Fourteen members strong, it bridges the gap between young performers' formal training and their entries into professional careers. As part of an engagement that lasts no more than two years, they work together with the members of the Ballett Zürich, dance with them in selected performances of the repertoire, as well as every season in a specially arranged ballet evening with world premieres by Douglas Lee or Christian Spuck.

The performances are accompanied by a comprehensive supporting program with introductory matinees before the ballet premieres, piece introductions before the performances, ballet discussions and a variety of special children's, youth and school projects.

Notable dancers

Rudolf Nureyev
Dame Margot Fonteyn
Polina Semionova
Viktorina Kapitonova
Debra Austin
Itziar Mendizabal
Hikaru Kobayashi
Cathy Marston

References 

Ballet companies in Switzerland
Companies based in Zürich
Culture of Zürich
Tourist attractions in Zürich